Mariano Ponce y Collantes (March 22, 1863 – May 23, 1918) was a Filipino physician, writer and active member of the Propaganda Movement. In Spain, he was among the founders of La Solidaridad and Asociación Hispano-Filipino. Among his significant works was Efemerides Filipinas, a column on historical events in the Philippines which appeared in La Oceania Española (1892–1893) and El Ideal (1911–1912). He wrote Ang Wika at Lahi (1917), a discussion on the importance of a national language. He also served as Bulacan's representative to the Philippine Assembly from 1909 to 1912.

Biography

Ponce was born in Baliwag, Bulacan where he completed his primary education. He later enrolled at the Colegio de San Juan de Letran and took up medicine at the University of Santo Tomas. In 1881, he traveled to Spain to continue his medical studies at the Universidad Central de Madrid.

There he joined Marcelo H. del Pilar, Graciano López Jaena, José Rizal and other Propagandists in Propaganda Movement. This espoused Filipino representation in the Spanish Cortes and reforms in the Spanish colonial authorities of the Philippines. He was the co-founder of La Solidaridad with fellow co-founder Graciano López Jaena. Ponce was also the head of the Literary Section of the Asociacion Hispano-Filipina, created to aid the Propaganda Movement where he served as secretary.

In La Solidaridad, his works included daily editorials on history, politics, sociology and travel. He also created himself many alias as well. His most common names are Naning, his nickname; Kalipulako, named after Lapu-Lapu; and Tigbalang, a supernatural being in Filipino folklore.

Ponce was imprisoned when the revolution broke out in August 1896 and was imprisoned for forty eight hours before being released. Fearing another arrest, he fled to France and later went to Hong Kong where he joined a group of Filipinos and Chinese Filipinos, who served as the international front of the Philippine revolution.

In 1898, Emilio Aguinaldo chose him to represent the First Philippine Republic. Ponce was tasked to draft a framework of the revolutionary government. In 1898, Emilio Aguinaldo selected him as a diplomatic representative of the First Republic to Japan. He traveled to Japan to seek aid and purchase weapons. During his stay he met with the founder and First President of the Chinese Republic; Sun Yat-Sen. Through discussions and negotiations, Dr. Sun and Ponce became close friends. Dr. Sun introduced Ponce to a Japanese Filipino man named José Ramos Ishikawa, who assisted Ponce in purchasing weapons and munitions for the revolution. The shipment, unfortunately failed to reach the Philippines due to a typhoon off the coast of Formosa.

Mariano returned to Manila with his wife, a Japanese girl named Okiyo Udanwara. In 1909, he was made director of "El Renacimiento" (The Renaissance). He joined the "Nacionalista Partido" (National Party) and established "El Ideal" (The Perfect), the party's official organization. Ponce later ran for a seat in the Philippine Assembly and was elected assemblyman for the second district of Bulacan in 1909. Ponce wrote his memoirs, "Cartas Sobre La Revolución" (Letters on the Revolution), he died in the Government Civil Hospital in Hong Kong, on May 23, 1918. His remains were originally interred in the Cementerio del Norte, Manila.  His remains were transferred and currently interred in the Ponce family mausoleum in Baliuag, according to local historian Rolando Villacorte.

On May 23, 2019, the National Historical Commission of the Philippines opened the Museo ni Mariano Ponce at the Ponce property in Baliuag, Bulacan.

References

Brando Dimagiba (2010). Mariano Ponce: Founder of La Solidaridad

External links 

Mariano Ponce: Founder of La Solidaridad
Mariano Ponce Timeline
 Scans of the Cartas Sobre La Revolución

1863 births
1918 deaths
People of the Philippine Revolution
Filipino exiles
19th-century Filipino medical doctors
Filipino writers
University of Santo Tomas alumni
Complutense University of Madrid alumni
People from Bulacan
Filipino Freemasons
Members of the House of Representatives of the Philippines from Bulacan
Colegio de San Juan de Letran alumni
Nacionalista Party politicians
Burials at the Manila North Cemetery
Members of the Philippine Legislature
Filipino propagandists